= Jamoniya Kalan =

- village
- Location within Madhya Pradesh Location within India
- Coordinates: 23.2155886°N 77.5698228°E
- Country: India
- State: Madhya Pradesh
- District: Bhopal
- Tehsil: Huzur
- Elevation: 442 m (1,450 ft)

Population (2011)
  - Total: 926
- Time zone: UTC+5:30 (IST)
- ISO 3166 code: MP-IN
- 2011 census code: 482444

Jamoniya Kalan is a village in the Bhopal district of Madhya Pradesh, India. It is located in the Huzur tehsil and the Phanda block.

== Demographics ==
According to the 2011 census of India, Jamoniya Kalan has 182 households. The effective literacy rate (i.e. the literacy rate of population excluding children aged 6 and below) is 71.18%.

Demographics (2011 Census)
| | Total | Male | Female |
|---|---|---|---|
| Population | 926 | 474 | 452 |
| Children aged below 6 years | 128 | 58 | 70 |
| Scheduled caste | 73 | 38 | 35 |
| Scheduled tribe | 54 | 29 | 25 |
| Literates | 568 | 325 | 243 |
| Workers (all) | 391 | 291 | 100 |
| Main workers (total) | 386 | 291 | 95 |
| Main workers: Cultivators | 164 | 129 | 35 |
| Main workers: Agricultural labourers | 204 | 149 | 55 |
| Main workers: Household industry workers | 1 | 1 | 0 |
| Main workers: Other | 17 | 12 | 5 |
| Marginal workers (total) | 5 | 0 | 5 |
| Marginal workers: Cultivators | 1 | 0 | 1 |
| Marginal workers: Agricultural labourers | 1 | 0 | 1 |
| Marginal workers: Household industry workers | 0 | 0 | 0 |
| Marginal workers: Others | 3 | 0 | 3 |
| Non-workers | 535 | 183 | 352 |
